The Department of Education, Language policy and Culture is the department of the Basque Government responsible for the community's education system and its policies regarding the Basque language and Basque culture.

Ministers 
 
 1978-1980: Karlos Santamaria
 
 1980-1984: Pedro Miguel Etxenike
 1984-1985: Juan Urrutia
 1985-1987: Juan Txurruka
 1987-1991: Jose Ramon Rekalde
 1991: Inaxio Oliveri
 1991-1995: Fernando Buesa
 1995-2001: Inaxio Oliveri
 2001-2005: Anjeles Iztueta
 2005-2009: Tontxu Campos
 2009-2012: Isabel Zelaa
 2012-2015: Cristina Uriarte
 2015-present: Alfonso Morais

References

External links 
  
  
  

Basque Government
Basque Country
Basque Country